This is a list of notable paintings by Georges Seurat (2 December 1859 - 29 March 1891). He is a Neo-Impressionist painter and together with Paul Signac noted for being the inventor of pointillism. The listing follows the 1980 book Georges Seurat and uses its catalogue numbers.

Paintings

Museums
Albright-Knox Art Gallery, Buffalo
Art Institute of Chicago, Chicago
Baltimore Museum of Art
Barnes Foundation, Philadelphia
Bristol Museum & Art Gallery, Bristol
Cleveland Museum of Art, Cleveland
Courtauld Institute of Art, London
Dallas Museum of Art, Dallas
Detroit Institute of Arts
Dumbarton Oaks Research Library and Collection, ,Washington. D.C.
Fine Arts Museums of San Francisco
Fogg Art Museum, Cambridge (Massachusetts)
Hermitage Museum, Saint Petersburg
Indianapolis Museum of Art, Indianapolis
Hiroshima Museum of Art, Hiroshima
Kelvingrove Art Gallery and Museum, Glasgow
Kröller-Müller Museum, Otterlo
Kunsthaus Zürich
Kunstmuseum Basel
Metropolitan Museum of Art, New York City
Museum of Modern Art, New York City
Minneapolis Institute of Art
Minnesota Marine Art Museum, Winona, Minnesota
Musée d'art moderne de Troyes
Musée d’Orsay, Paris
:fr:Musée de l'Annonciade, Saint-Tropez
Musée des beaux-arts de Bordeaux
Musée des Beaux-Arts, Tournai
Nationalmuseum, Stockholm
National Gallery, London
National Gallery of Art, Washington, D.C.
National Gallery of Australia, Canberra
National Gallery Prague
Nelson-Atkins Museum of Art, Kansas City, Missouri
Norton Simon Museum, Pasadena, California
Palais des Beaux-Arts de Lille
Philadelphia Museum of Art, Philadelphia
Phillips Collection, Washington D.C.
Pola Museum of Art, Hakone
Royal Museums of Fine Arts of Belgium, Brussels
Saint Louis Art Museum
Scottish National Gallery, Edinburgh
Smith College Museum of Art, Northampton (Massachusetts)
Solomon R. Guggenheim Museum, New York City
Stiftung Sammlung E. G. Bührle, Zürich
Tate Gallery
The Hyde Collection, Glens Falls
Van Gogh Museum, Amsterdam
Virginia Museum of Fine Arts, Richmond (Virginia)
Walker Art Gallery, Liverpool
Wallraf-Richartz-Museum, Cologne
Yale University Art Gallery, New Haven, Connecticut

See also
 Bathers at Asnières (1884)
 A Sunday Afternoon on the Island of La Grande Jatte (1884–1886)
 Models (1884–1886)
 Parade de cirque (1887–1888)
 Young Woman Powdering Herself (1889–1890)
 Le Chahut (1889–1890)
 The Channel of Gravelines, Petit Fort Philippe (1890)
 The Circus (1890–1891)

Notes

References

External links

 
 
 

Lists of paintings